Charles Sheeler (July 16, 1883 – May 7, 1965) was an American artist known for his Precisionist paintings, commercial photography, and the avant-garde film, Manhatta, which he made in collaboration with Paul Strand. Sheeler is recognized as one of the early adopters of modernism in American art.

Early life and career
Charles Rettew Sheeler Jr. was born in Philadelphia, Pennsylvania. He attended the Pennsylvania Museum School of Industrial Art from 1900 to 1903, and then the Pennsylvania Academy of Fine Arts, where he studied under William Merritt Chase. He found early success as a painter and exhibited at the Macbeth Gallery in 1908. Most of his education was in drawing and other applied arts. He went to Italy with other students, where he was intrigued by the Italian painters of the Middle Ages, such as Giotto and Piero della Francesca. After a trip to Paris in 1909, Sheeler was inspired by works of Cubist artists like Pablo Picasso and Georges Braque.  Returning to the United States, Sheeler felt that he would not be able to make a living as a modernist painter, so he took up commercial photography, focusing on architectural subjects. Sheeler was a self-taught photographer, learning his trade on a five dollar Brownie. 

Early in his career, he was greatly impacted by the death of his close friend Morton Livingston Schamberg during the influenza epidemic of 1918. Schamberg's painting had focused heavily on machinery and technology, a theme that featured prominently in Sheeler's own work.

Sheeler owned a farmhouse in Doylestown, Pennsylvania, about 39 miles outside Philadelphia, which he shared with Schamberg until the latter's death. He was so fond of the home's 19th century stove that he called it his "companion" and made it a subject of his photographs. The farmhouse itself serves a prominent role in many of his photographs, which include shots of the bedroom, kitchen, and stairway. At one point he was quoted as calling it his "cloister."  His work was also part of the painting event in the art competition at the 1932 Summer Olympics.

On April 2, 1939, Sheeler married Musya Metas Sokolova, his second wife, six years after the death in 1933 of first wife Katharine Baird Shaffer (married April 7, 1921). In 1942, Sheeler joined the Metropolitan Museum of Art  as a senior research fellow in photography, worked on a project in Connecticut with the photographer Edward Weston, and moved with Musya to Irvington-on-Hudson, some twenty miles north of New York. Sheeler worked for the Metropolitan Museum's Department of Publications from 1942 to 1945, photographing artworks and historical objects.

Sheeler painted in a Precisionist style that complemented his photography and has been described as "quasi-photographic".

Manhatta 
In 1920, Sheeler invited photographer Paul Strand to collaborate on a "portrait" of Manhattan in film. The resulting 35mm nine-minute series of vignettes, called Manhatta after Walt Whitman's poem, Mannahatta, was the first avant-garde film created in America.

Work with Ford Motor Company 
He was hired by the Ford Motor Company to photograph and make paintings of their factories.

Photography and film work

Films created by Charles Sheeler
1921 Manhatta (with Paul Strand)]

Photographic works
1917 Doylestown House: Stairs from Below (Metropolitan Museum of Art)
1927 Criss-Crossed Conveyors, River Rouge Plant, Ford Motor Company (Metropolitan Museum of Art)
1928 Images from Vogue and Vanity Fair

Selected paintings

Early works

 Church Street El (1920) – The Cleveland Museum of Art, Cleveland 
 Still Life (1925) – M. H. de Young Memorial Museum, San Francisco
 Lady of the Sixties (1925) – Boston Museum of Fine Arts, Boston
 Upper Deck (1928–1929) – Harvard Art Museum, Cambridge, MA
 American Landscape (1930) – Museum of Modern Art, New York City
 Americana (1931) – Metropolitan Museum of Art, New York City
 Classic Landscape (1931) – Barney A. Ebsworth collection
 View of New York (1931) – Boston Museum of Fine Arts, Boston

 Interior with Stove (1932) – National Gallery of Art, Washington, D.C.
 River Rouge Plant (1933) – Whitney Museum of American Art, New York City
 American Interior (1934) – Yale University Gallery, New Haven
 Ephrata (1934) – D'Amour Museum of Fine Arts, Springfield, MA
 City Interior (1936) – Worcester Art Museum, Worcester

Power series
In 1940, Fortune Magazine published a series of six paintings commissioned of Sheeler. To prepare for the series, Sheeler spent a year traveling and taking photographs. Fortune editors aimed to “reflect life through forms … [that] trace the firm pattern of the human mind,” and Sheeler chose six subjects to fulfill this theme: a water wheel (Primitive Power), a steam turbine (Steam Turbine), the railroad (Rolling Power), a hydroelectric turbine (Suspended Power), an airplane (Yankee Clipper) and a dam (Conversation: Sky and Earth) .
 Conversation: Sky and Earth (1939) – Amon Carter Museum of American Art, Fort Worth
 Primitive Power (1939) – The Regis Collection, Minneapolis
 Rolling Power (1939) – Smith College, Northampton
 Steam Turbine (1939) – Butler Institute of American Art, Youngstown
 Suspended Power (1939) – Dallas Museum of Art, Dallas
 Yankee Clipper (1939) – Rhode Island School of Design, Providence

Later works

 Interior (1940) – National Gallery of Art, Washington, D.C.
 Fugue (1940) – Boston Museum of Fine Arts, Boston
 Bucks County Barn (1940) – Terra Foundation for American Art, Chicago
 The Artist Looks at Nature (1943) – Art Institute of Chicago, Chicago
 Water (1945) – Metropolitan Museum of Art, New York
 Incantation (1946) – Brooklyn Museum, Brooklyn
 Amoskeag Canal (1948) – Currier Museum of Art, Manchester
 Windows (1952) – Hirschl & Adler Galleries, New York City
 Conversation Piece (1952) – Reynolda House Museum of American Art, Winston-Salem
 Aerial Gyrations (1953) – San Francisco Museum of Modern Art, San Francisco
 New England Irrelevancies (1953) – Boston Museum of Fine Arts, Boston
 Ore Into Iron (1953) – Boston Museum of Fine Arts, Boston
 Stacks in Celebration (1954) – Dayton Art Institute, Dayton
 Architectural Cadences Number 4 (1954) – Amon Carter Museum of American Art, Fort Worth
 Lunenburg (1954) – Boston Museum of Fine Arts, Boston
 Midwest (1954) – Walker Art Center, Minneapolis
 Golden Gate (1955) – Metropolitan Museum of Art, New York City
 Western Industrial (1955) – Art Institute of Chicago, Chicago
 The Web (1955) – Neuberger Museum of Art, Purchase, NY
 On a Shaker Theme (1956) – Boston Museum of Fine Arts, Boston
 Red Against White (1957) – Boston Museum of Fine Arts, Boston

 Composition Around White (1959) – Collection of Deborah and Ed Shein

Exhibitions
 "Charles Sheeler: Paintings, Drawings, Photographs" – Museum of Modern Art, New York, October 4 – November 1, 1939.
 "Paintings by Charles Sheeler" – Dayton Art Institute, Dayton, Ohio, November 2 – December 2, 1944.
 "Charles Sheeler: A Retrospective Exhibition" – Art Galleries, University of California at Los Angeles, October 11 – November 7, 1954. Toured November 18 – June 15, 1955 at the M. H. de Young Memorial Museum, San Francisco; Fine Arts Gallery of San Diego; and Fort Worth Art Center, Fort Worth, Texas; Pennsylvania Academy of the Fine Arts, Philadelphia; Munson-Williams Proctor Institute, Utica, New York.
 "Charles Sheeler Retrospective Exhibition" – Allentown Art Museum, Allentown, Pennsylvania, November 17 – December 31, 1961.
 "Charles Sheeler Retrospective Exhibition" - March 17 – April 14, 1963 - State University of Iowa, Department of Art.
 "Charles Sheeler" – National Collection of Fine Arts, Washington, DC, October 10 – November 24, 1968. Toured January 10 – April 27, 1969 at the Philadelphia Museum of Art, and the Whitney Museum of American Art, New York.
 "Charles Sheeler: Across Media" – National Gallery of Art, Washington, DC, May 7 – August 27, 2006. Toured at the Art Institute of Chicago, October 7, 2006 – January 7, 2007; and the M. H. de Young Memorial Museum, February 10 – May 6, 2007. 50 works included, including paintings, photographs, works on paper, and a film.
 "The Photography of Charles Sheeler" – Museum of Fine Arts, Boston. Toured at the Metropolitan Museum of Art, New York, June 3 – August 17, 2003; the Detroit Institute of Arts; and the Georgia O'Keeffe Museum. Nearly 100 works, including 90 photographs.
 "Charles Sheeler: Fashion, Photography, and Sculptural Form", Curated by Kirsten M. Jensen, Ph.D., Gerry & Marguerite Lenfest, Chief Curator, James A. Michener Art Museum, March 18-July 9, 2017.

Gallery

Paintings

Photographs

Notes
 "Power: A portfolio by Charles Sheeler", Fortune magazine (December 1940) Time Inc., Volume XXII, Number 6

References

Further reading
.
.
.
.
 Murphy, Jessica. “Charles Sheeler (1883–1965).” In Heilbrunn Timeline of Art History. New York: The Metropolitan Museum of Art, 2000–. (November 2009)
.

External links

Oral history interview with Charles Sheeler, 1958 Dec. 9, Archives of American Art, Smithsonian Institution
Oral history interview with Charles Sheeler, 1959 June 18, Archives of American Art, Smithsonian Institution
Charles Sheeler: Across Media, The National Gallery of Art, Washington, DC 

20th-century American photographers
20th-century American painters
American male painters
Painters from Pennsylvania
Modern artists
Pennsylvania Academy of the Fine Arts alumni
Precisionism
1883 births
1965 deaths
University of the Arts (Philadelphia) alumni
Burials at Sleepy Hollow Cemetery
Commercial photographers
Olympic competitors in art competitions
Artists from Philadelphia
20th-century American male artists
Public Works of Art Project artists